Changyŏn County is a county in South Hwanghae province, North Korea.

Geography
Changyŏn is bordered to the north by Kwail and Songhwa, to the east by Samch'ŏn and T'aet'an, to the south by Ryongyŏn, and to the west by the Yellow Sea. Most of the land in Changyŏn is composed of flat plains, with mountains forming its borders.

History
Changyŏn county was created under the Yi dynasty. Chaeryŏng was briefly merged into the newly formed Hwanghae District in 1895 during an experimental redistricting, but was restored to its previous form in 1896. The county's current form was settled in the 1952 redistricting changes, when the entire south of the county was split away to form Ryongyŏn county. In 1956 it became part of South Hwanghae Province when the former Hwanghae Province was split.

Transportation
The county is served by the Changyŏn Line of the Korean State Railway, which stops at Ragyŏn and Changyŏn stations. There is also a highway which runs through Changyŏn-ŭp.

Administrative divisions
The county is divided into one town (ŭp), 1 Worker's District (rodongjagu) and 19 villages (ri).

People born in Changyŏn
 Ro Ch'ŏn-myŏng (1912-1957), poet
 Ryu Kyŏng-hwan (1936-???), poet

See also
Sinchon Massacre
No Gun Ri
Geography of North Korea
Administrative divisions of North Korea

References

Counties of South Hwanghae